Ramanbhai Mahipatram Nilkanth (13 March 1868 – 6 March 1928) was a Gujarati novelist, essayist, literary critic from India. The Ramanlal Nilkanth Hasya Paritoshik is named after him.

Life
Ramanbhai Nilkanth was born on 13 March 1868  in Ahmedabad to Mahipatram Rupram Nilkanth and Rupkunwarba who were social reformers. He completed his primary and secondary education in Ahmedabad. He matriculated in 1883. He joined Gujarat College, Ahmedabad in 1884 and completed his B.A. from Elphinstone College, Bombay in 1887 and later obtained his LL.B. 

His first wife, Hansvadan, died at a young age and he married again to Vidyagauri Nilkanth, one of the first female graduates from state, in 1887. He worked as a clerk in the government office. He had later served as a Judge in Godhra. 

He was awarded title of Rai Bahadur and later knighthood in 1927. 

He served as the mayor of Ahmedabad. He was also the first secretary of the Ahmedabad Red Cross founded in 1923. He served as the president of Gujarati Sahitya Parishad in 1926.

He died on 6 March 1928 at Ahmedabad. His daughters, Vinodini Nilkanth and Sarojini Mehta, were also writers. British travel writer Pico Iyer is his great-grandson.

Works
His humour novel Bhadrambhadra (1900) was a satire on language and social puritans. It is influenced by The Pickwick Papers and Don Quixote. His other novel is Shodhma (1915, incomplete). He wrote classic play Raino Parvat (1914). Hasyamandir (1915, with Vidyagauri) is collection of humour essays. His works of criticism are Vakyapruththakruti ane Nibandh Rachana (1903), Saraswatichandra nu Avlokan and Hridayveenanu Avlokan. Two volumes of Dharm Ane Samaj (1932, 1935) are his philosophical work discussing religion and society. Kavita Ane Sahitya is his four volumes on poetry and prose. The Volume 1 (1904) contains articles on prosody and rhetoric; Volume 2 (1904) contains articles on practical criticism; Volume 3 (1928) contains occasional lectures and essays and Volume 4 (1929) contains some poems, short stories and essays on humour. Gujaratno Sankshipta Itihas (Short History of Gujarat) and Vivahvidhi (1889) are his other works. He also edited Gyansudha. Through his criticism, he tried to formulate a theory of artistic and literary beauty, which was influenced by the theories of English critics of his time.

References

Further reading

External links

 

Gujarati-language poets
Gujarati-language writers
1928 deaths
1868 births
Companions of the Order of the Indian Empire
Rai Bahadurs
Indian Knights Bachelor
19th-century Indian novelists
19th-century Indian essayists
Indian literary critics
19th-century Indian politicians
Mayors of Ahmedabad
Indian social reformers
Novelists from Gujarat
19th-century Indian poets
Poets from Gujarat
20th-century Indian poets
20th-century Indian novelists
Dramatists and playwrights from Gujarat
Nilkanth family